USS Griswold (DE-7) was an Evarts-class short-hull destroyer escort in the service of the United States Navy, named for Ensign Don T. Griswold, who perished during the Battle of Midway 1942.

Namesake

Don T. Griswold, Jr. was born on 8 July 1917 in Bryan, Texas. He attended Iowa State and after graduation joined the Naval Aviation Corps. On 6 June 1942 during the Battle of Midway, his Douglas SBD-3 "Dauntless" scout-bomber scored a hit on a Japanese ship but was hit by antiaircraft fire and plunged into the sea. Griswold's radioman-gunner, Kenneth Cecil Bunch, also died. Griswold was posthumously awarded the Distinguished Flying Cross.

Construction
Griswold (DE-7) was launched 9 January 1943, by Boston Naval Shipyard, Charlestown, Massachusetts; sponsored by Mrs. Don T. Griswold, mother of Ensign Don T. Griswold. She was commissioned 28 April 1943.

Service history
After shakedown in Bermuda, Griswold headed for the Pacific, reaching Bora Bora, Society Islands, via Norfolk, Virginia and the Panama Canal 23 July 1943. Immediately pressed into service, she escorted convoys through the South Pacific, until April 1944. On 12 September, she conducted a 4-hour attack on a Japanese submarine off Guadalcanal, and although debris and an oil slick rose to the surface, she was not credited with a kill.

Undaunted, Griswold struck again 3 months later and this time recorded a kill. At 2200 on the night of 23 December, patrolling off Lunga Point, Guadalcanal, she was dispatched to investigate a periscope sighting. Alert sonar operators picked up the contact immediately, and held it for the next 5 hours, as the determined ship conducted attack after attack on the elusive Japanese raider. Oil slicks and air bubbles after the sixth and seventh attacks told Griswold that her quarry was hit. This was confirmed shortly before 0300 on 24 December, when a periscope poked up out of the water. Griswold charged in for her eighth attack, laying a lethal pattern of twelve depth charges. A heavy oil slick dotted with debris rose to the surface, and the tenacious ship and crew were credited with sinking .

After overhaul at Mare Island, the escort ship returned to the Pacific theatre on 3 June 1944 to escort convoys and participate in training exercises out of Pearl Harbor well into 1945. From 12 March-6 May 1945, she remained on station at Eniwetok as flagship for Commander Task Group 96.3, under Commander T. F. Fowler. The long Pacific campaign was moving into its final phase that spring as American forces invaded Okinawa, a short step from the Japanese home islands; and Griswold soon moved up to the front.

Reaching Okinawa on 27 May, Griswold immediately took up station on the ASW screen, and was shortly rewarded with two kamikaze kills, 31 May and 5 June. The second of those would-be kamikazes dived on Griswold, but she evaded it and the marauder exploded into the ocean so close that fragments of the Japanese plane showered over her.

On 29 June, Griswold departed Okinawa, escorting a convoy to Leyte Gulf, Philippines, and continuing on to Ulithi for screening work. At war's end, she sailed triumphantly into Japanese waters, anchoring in Tokyo Bay on 10 September. Embarking passengers for stateside, Griswold cleared Tokyo 6 days later and arrived San Pedro, Los Angeles on 8 October via Eniwetok and Pearl Harbor.

She decommissioned there on 19 November 1945, and was struck from the Naval Vessel Register on 5 December. The hulk was sold to Dulien Steel Products, Seattle, Wash., for scrapping on 27 November 1946.

Awards

References

External links
 Photo gallery at Navsource.org

World War II frigates and destroyer escorts of the United States
Evarts-class destroyer escorts
Ships built in Boston
1943 ships